Ferhat Odabaşı (born 15 July 1983) is a Turkish football coach and a former player. He is the goalkeeping coach with Altay.

Club career
Odabaşı began the 2007–08 Süper Lig season with Gençlerbirliği OFTAŞ, but only made five league appearances for the club before moving to TFF First League side Eskişehirspor. He played for Çaykur Rizespor for the 2008–09 TFF First League season, prior to joining Karabükspor.

References

External links
 

1983 births
People from Divriği
Living people
Turkish footballers
Turkey youth international footballers
Association football goalkeepers
Hacettepe S.K. footballers
Eskişehirspor footballers
Çaykur Rizespor footballers
Kardemir Karabükspor footballers
Boluspor footballers
Kayseri Erciyesspor footballers
Göztepe S.K. footballers
Orduspor footballers
Elazığspor footballers
MKE Ankaragücü footballers
Süper Lig players
TFF First League players
TFF Second League players